The Regional Council of French Guiana (French: Conseil régional de la Guyane) was the elected regional council of French Guiana. It ceased to exist on 1 January 2016, when it was replaced by the Assembly of French Guiana.

The council was composed of 31 members, presided over by the President of the Regional Council of French Guiana. The council was headquartered at the Cité Administrative Régionale, near the outskirts of Cayenne.

See also
 Politics of French Guiana
 List of legislatures by country

External links
 Regional Assembly (French)

References

 

Government of French Guiana
Former legislatures of Overseas France
French Guiana
French Guiana
2016 disestablishments in France